The 2019 Canada Women's Sevens was the fifth tournament within the 2018–19 World Rugby Women's Sevens Series and the fifth edition of the Canada Women's Sevens to be played in the series. It was held over the weekend of 11–12 May 2019 at Westhills Stadium in Langford, British Columbia.

Format
The teams are drawn into three pools of four teams each. Each team plays every other team in their pool once. The top two teams from each pool advance to the Cup brackets while the top 2 third place teams also compete in the Cup/Plate. The other teams from each group play-off for the Challenge Trophy.

Teams
Eleven core teams are participating in the tournament along with one invited team, Brazil:

Pool stage
All times in Pacific Daylight Time (UTC−07:00)

Pool A

Pool B

Pool C

Knockout stage

Challenge Trophy

5th place

Cup

Tournament placings

Source: World Rugby

Players

Scoring leaders

Source: World Rugby

See also
 World Rugby Women's Sevens Series
 2018–19 World Rugby Women's Sevens Series

References

External links
 Tournament Page
 World Rugby Page

2019
2018–19 World Rugby Women's Sevens Series
2019 in Canadian rugby union
2019 in Canadian women's sports
2019 in women's rugby union
May 2019 sports events in Canada
Sports competitions in British Columbia